Andrei Luzgin (born 2 February 1973) is a tennis coach and former Estonian tennis player. He achieved his career high ATP singles ranking in 1996 at No. 1212. The same year he also achieved his career high doubles ranking at No. 844.

Andrei Luzgin held an all-time record of most total wins for Estonia Davis Cup team until it was broken by Mait Künnap.

References

External links 
 
 
 

1973 births
Living people
Estonian male tennis players
Estonian tennis coaches
Estonian people of Russian descent